Jean-Baptiste Louvet de Couvray (12 June 1760 – 25 August 1797) was a French novelist, playwright and journalist.

Life

Early life and literary works
Born in Paris as the son of a stationer, Louvet became a bookseller's clerk, and first attracted attention with the first part of his novel Les Amours du chevalier de Faublas (Paris, 1787; English translation illustrated by etchings by Louis Monzies in 1898); it was followed in 1788 by Six semaines de la vie du chevalier de Faublas and in 1790 by La Fin des amours du chevalier de Faublas. The heroine, Lodoiska, was based on the wife of a jeweller in the Palais Royal, with whom Louvet had an affair. She divorced her husband in 1792 and married Louvet in 1793. His second novel, Émilie de Varmont (1791), was intended to prove the utility and necessity of divorce and of the marriage of priests, questions raised by the French Revolution; all his works tended to advocate revolutionary ideals.

He attempted to have one of his unpublished plays, L'Anoblié conspirateur, performed at the Comédie-Française, and records naively that one of its managers, d'Orfeuil, listened to the reading of the first three acts impatiently, exclaiming at last: "I should need cannon in order to put that piece on the stage". A sort of farce at the expense of the army of the Royalist émigrés, La Grande Revue des armes noire et blanche, had, however, better success: it was on stage for twenty-five nights.

Early activism
Louvet was first brought into notice as a politician by his Paris justifié, in reply to a truly incendiary pamphlet in which Jean Joseph Mounier, after the removal of King Louis XVI from the Palace of Versailles to Paris in October 1789, had attacked the capital (which was still relatively peaceful), and argued that the court should be established elsewhere. This led to Louvet's election to the Jacobin Club, for which, as he wrote bitterly in his Memoirs, the qualifications were then a genuine civisme and some talent.

A self-styled philosophe and radical revolutionary, Louvet subsequently campaigned against despotism and reaction, which he identified with the moderate constitutional monarchy advocated by the Marquis de la Fayette, the Abbé Maury, and other disciples of Niccolò Machiavelli.

Deputy and girondist
On 25 December 1791 he presented at the tribune of the Legislative Assembly his Petition contre les princes, which would have major influence during the First French Empire. Elected deputy to the Assembly for the départment of Loiret, he gave his first speech in January 1792.

He attached himself to the Girondists, whose vague deism, sentimental humanitarianism and ardent republicanism he fully shared, and from March to November 1792 he published, at Jean Marie Roland's expense, a bi-weekly journal-affiche, of which the title, La Sentinelle, proclaimed its mission to open all of Europe to the Enlightenment at a time when, after the Habsburg declaration of war on France and the outbreak of the French Revolutionary Wars, a schism between the king and his subjects had become obvious.

On 10 August (the effective fall of the Monarchy), Louvet became editor of the Journal des Débats and, both as a journalist and deputy in the National Convention, made himself conspicuous by his attacks on Maximilien Robespierre, Jean-Paul Marat and the other Montagnards, whom he later claimed he would have succeeded in bringing to justice after the September Massacres were it not for the poor support he received from the Girondist leaders. On 29 October he accused Robespierre of creating a personality cult, governing the Paris "Conseil General" and paying the "Septembriseurs". Marat was accused of being asocial, establishing a dictatorship and as an agent of England. He denounced Robespierre as "a Royalist", and other Montagnards as crypto-Orléanists. Robespierre was taken by surprise and had to be defended by Danton. In November he published his speech under the name A Maximilien Robespierre et à ses royalistes (accusation). Louvet admitted the preferred Pétion de Villeneuve as friend. It is probable, however, that his attack and gauche (?) libel contributed to the Girondist downfall (as well as his own).

His courageous attitude at the king's trial, when he supported the appeal to the people over the outright death penalty, added to hostility towards his party. Nonetheless, he defended the Girondists to the last moment, displaying an incriminating courage. After the crisis of 31 May 1793, when François Hanriot and the sans-culottes stormed the Convention, he joined his defeated faction in their flight from Paris. His wife Lodoiska, who had actively cooperated in his campaigns, was also placed in danger by the developments.

Thermidor and directory
After the onset of the Thermidorian Reaction and the fall of Robespierre (27 July 1794), he was recalled to the Convention, when he was instrumental in bringing Jean-Baptiste Carrier and the others responsible for the drownings at Nantes to justice. His influence became considerable: he was elected a member of the Committee of the Constitution, president of the Assembly, and member of the Committee of Public Safety, against the overgrown power with which he in earlier days protested against.

His conflict with the Montagnards had not made him reactionary: he attacked the Jeunesse dorée, and was regarded by many as a pillar of Jacobinism. La Sentinelle reappeared, under his auspices, preaching union among republicans. Under the Directory (1795) he was elected a member of the Council of Five Hundred, of which he was secretary, and also a member of the Institut de France.

Meanwhile, he had returned to his trade and set up a bookseller's shop in the Palais Royal. But, in spite of the fact that he had once more denounced the Jacobins in La Sentinelle, he had come to be seen as a major enemy by the Jeunesse dorée. His shop was attacked by the young men with cries of À bas la Loupe, à bas la belle Ledoiska, à bas les gardes du corps de Louvet! ("Down with the She-Wolf, down with beautiful Ledoiska, down with Louvet's bodyguards!"); he and his wife were insulted in the streets and the theatres: À bas les Louvets et les Louvetants! ("Down with the Louvets and the Louvetants!" - a reference to his guards, based on the antiquated senses of the verb louveter), and he was forced to leave Paris. The Directory appointed him to the consulship at Palermo, in the Kingdom of Naples, but he died before taking up his post.

Louvet's Memoirs
In 1795 Louvet published a portion of his Memoirs under the title of Quelques notices pour l'histoire et le récit de mes perils depuis le 31 mai 1793. They were mainly written in the various hiding-places in which Louvet took refuge, and they give a vivid picture of the sufferings of the exiled Girondists. They form a major document for the study of the psychology of the Revolution, as they give insight into the Louvet's own states of mind and political choices. The first complete edition of the Mémoires de Louvet de Couvray, edited with preface, notes and tables, by François Victor Alphonse Aulard, were published in Paris in 1889.

References

External links 
Jean-Baptiste Louvet de Couvray on data.bnf.fr
 
 Books by Jean-Baptiste Louvet de Couvray at Project Gutenberg
Full text of Quelques notices pour l'histoire et le récit de mes perils depuis le 31 mai 1793

1760 births
1797 deaths
Writers from Paris
Deputies to the French National Convention
Members of the Council of Five Hundred
18th-century French diplomats
18th-century French dramatists and playwrights
French memoirists
18th-century French novelists
18th-century French journalists
Newspaper editors of the French Revolution
French booksellers
People on the Committee of Public Safety
Presidents of the National Convention
French erotica writers
18th-century deaths from tuberculosis
18th-century essayists
Tuberculosis deaths in France
18th-century memoirists